is a former Japanese football player.

Playing career
Kosaka was born in Fukui Prefecture on September 14, 1975. After graduating from Komazawa University, he joined the Japan Football League club Omiya Ardija in 1998. He played often as a midfielder during the first season and the club was promoted to the new J2 League in 1999. However he did not play as often in 2002 and he retired at the end of the 2002 season.

Club statistics

References

External links

1975 births
Living people
Komazawa University alumni
Association football people from Fukui Prefecture
Japanese footballers
J2 League players
Japan Football League (1992–1998) players
Omiya Ardija players
Association football midfielders